SCSI / ATA Translation (SAT) is a set of standards developed by the T10 subcommittee, defining how to communicate with ATA devices through a SCSI application layer.  The standard attempts to be consistent with the SCSI architectural model, the SCSI Primary Commands, and the SCSI Block Commands standards.

The standard allows for translation of SCSI read and write commands.

The standard also provides the ability to control exactly what ATA operations are executed on a target device by defining two new SCSI operation codes:
 ATA PASS THROUGH (Ax, 12-byte) – 28-bit ATA command without  or  fields
 ATA PASS THROUGH (8x, 16-byte) – 28- or 48-bit ATA command without  or  fields

History 
The first SAT standard was finalized in 2007 and published as ANSI INCITS 431–2007. It was succeeded by SAT-2 published as INCITS 465 in 2009, and SAT-3, which was finalized by T10 and is expected to be published as INCITS 517 in 2014. SAT-4 is in development. SAT has also been adopted in 2008 as an ISO/IEC JTC 1/SC 25 standard, namely ISO/IEC 14776-921.

SAT-2 was finalized in 2009. Significant additions in SAT-2 are ATAPI translations, NCQ control, 
persistent reservations, non-volatile cache translation, and ATA security mode translations. The standard also defines a new data structure returned in the sense data known as the ATA Return Descriptor that contains the ATA taskfile registers. SAT-2 was promulgated as ISO/IEC 14776–922 in 2011.

SAT-3 was finalized in 2014, and SAT-4 in 2016. Since the standards have become ANSI standards, the drafts are inaccessible to the public. SAT-4 added a 32-byte  ATA PASS-THROUGH command. This version of the command support additional  and  fields used by some ATA commands.
Work on SAT-5 began in 2017. , it has not yet become a standard, making its drafts freely available.

Applications
SAT is useful for enabling ATA-device-specific commands in a number of scenarios:
 SATA disks attached to SAS controllers
 [P]ATA or SATA disks attached via USB bridges (which actually speak SCSI over the wire either using the older USB Mass Storage Bulk-Only Transfer protocol or the newer USB Attached SCSI protocol). 
 [P]ATA or SATA disks attached via FireWire bridges (which speak SCSI SBP-2 over the wire)
 Some USB external storage devices, including some USB flash drives, are using SAT to achieve some advanced features like wear leveling and/or TRIM

A problem with many SAT implementations is that when two or more ATA devices are attached to the same SAT interface, the ATA passthrough only serves one device. This causes issues with fetching S.M.A.R.T. data, since only one device can be addressed.

See also 
 Advanced SCSI Programming Interface

References

SCSI
AT Attachment
14776-921
American National Standards Institute standards
USB